Mazak may refer to:

 Alberich Mazak
 Mazak (alloy), UK brand name for a zinc-based alloy also known as Zamak
 Yamazaki Mazak Corporation